Breadcrumb Trail is the first live album by Dublin based band The Frames, recorded in Stará Pekárna, Brno in the Czech Republic. The album was released on June 2002 on Indies Records in the Czech Republic and the Frames' own indie label Plateau Records in Ireland. The band's line-up for this album featured Glen Hansard on guitar and vocals, Colm Mac Con Iomaire on violin, Joseph Doyle on bass guitar and backing vocals, Simon Good on lead guitar and Dave Hingerty on drums.

The album also featured a guest violinist Jan Hrubý (Tracks 4 and 6) and vocal performances from Markéta and Zuzana Irglová (on "Star Star").

Track listing
 "Lay Me Down" (5:06)
 "What Happens When The Heart Just Stops" (5:12)
 "Rent Day Blues" (7:27)
 "Fitzcarraldo"  (9:40)
 "Giving Me Wings" (3:24)
 "Ohio Riverboat Song" (6:06)
 "Santa Maria" (8:56)
 "Mighty Sword" (5:43)
 "Red Chord" (9:35)
 "New Partner" (5:34)

Bonus tracks:
11. "Look Back Now" (4:15)
12. "Star, Star" (4:09)

References

External links

The Frames albums
2002 live albums